The following is a list of areas classified by Birdlife International as Secondary Areas, namely areas which contain at least one restricted-range endemic bird species, but do not qualify for the full Endemic Bird Area status.

Secondary areas in North and Central America

Secondary areas in South America

Secondary areas in Africa, Europe and the Middle East

Secondary Areas in Continental Asia

Secondary Areas in South-east Asian islands, New Guinea and Australia

Secondary Areas in the Pacific Islands region

See also
 List of Endemic Bird Areas of the World

References
All material on this page is sourced from the Secondary Areas section (pages 653 to 678) of Endemic Bird Areas of the World: Priorities for Biodiversity Conservation by Alison J. Stattersfield, Michael J. Crosby, Adrian J. Long and David C. Wege (1998), published by Birdlife International 

Secondary Areas, List of
Endemism